Thiara rodericensis is a species of freshwater snail, a gastropod mollusk in the family Thiaridae.

Description

Distribution

References

External links

Thiaridae
Gastropods described in 1876